On May 16, 2002 an explosion occurred at the Evergreen Hotel in Davao City, Philippines leaving American, Michael Meiring severely injured. The explosion was caused by a dynamite allegedly kept by Meiring inside his hotel room.

Background
On May 16, 2002, an explosion occurred at the Evergreen Hotel in Davao City, particularly inside the room which was stayed by American oncologist, Michael Meiring who was reportedly doing treasure hunting in the country since the 1990s. The explosion was caused by a dynamite he was allegedly keeping inside the room. Meiring was confined at the Davao Doctors Hospital after he sustained third-degree burns and had his leg amputated.

On May 19, 2002 Agents from the US Federal Bureau of Investigation (FBI) reportedly brought Meiring out of Davao City to Manila via Subic Air through chartered flight allegedly arranged by the US Embassy in Manila. By May 22, he is already confined at the Makati Medical Center which is one of the two hospitals accredited by Meiring's medical insurance. Meiring's insurance could not cover the American's bills at the Davao Medical Center which is the reportedly the reason for his immediate transfer.

Victim

Michael Terrence Meiring is a former citizen of South Africa of British descent who reportedly fled the African country during the later years of the Apartheid era. He reportedly practiced his profession as a doctor for the South African police while being affiliated with the African National Congress of Nelson Mandela.

David Hawthorn, a close friend of Meiring claimed that his friend confessed of giving of a box of old US federal notes to the Mandela government. The box was one of 12 with each estimated to contain $500 million each. Meiring secured permits from the Fidel Ramos administration to hunt for treasure in sunken American and Japanese ships. He later partnered with a powerful Manila-based group which has links to James Rowe. According to American intelligence analyst Dan Crawford, Rowe himself is linked to a Nevada white supremacist and tax revolt group which has connection the Neo-Nazi Party in the United States and the Fifth Reich group of Germany.

Meiring's American friends suspected that the Manila group may have conspired against him. According to both Hawthorn and secretary Silvya Durante, Meiring was feared for his life who reportedly says "it has to do with the treasure".

Legacy

The explosion is attributed to President Rodrigo Duterte's hostility towards the United States. In May 2016, Duterte's spokesman Peter Laviña cites the incident that involve Meiring as the reason for Duterte's negative sentiment towards the United States.

Meiring was brought out of the country supposedly by US Embassy officials despite facing charges of possessing explosives which Duterte took offense against. He called the alleged act a disrespect against the sovereignty of the Philippines. Duterte says that he has received no apology from the United States for the incident.

Duterte was still Mayor of Davao City at the time of the incident. At that time, Duterte said that he holds Meiring responsible for the incident saying that he refused to cooperate with the police when they made a search in his room before the explosion.

References

2002 crimes in the Philippines
History of Davao City
Philippines–United States relations